Genmab A/S is a Danish biotechnology company, founded in February 1999 by Florian Schönharting, at the time managing director of BankInvest Biomedical venture fund.  The company is based in Copenhagen, Denmark – internationally, it operates through the subsidiaries Genmab B.V. in Utrecht, The Netherlands, Genmab U.S., Inc. in Princeton, USA, and Genmab K.K. in Tokyo, Japan. It's a dual listed company with shares traded on the Copenhagen Stock Exchange in Denmark, and on NASDAQ Global Select Market in the US.

The company has 6 approved antibodies (monoclonal and bispecific) used in 6 marketed products, covering cancer indications and autoimmune diseases.

Proprietary, marketed with Seagen:
 Tivdak (tisotumab vedotin-tftv) for the treatment of previously treated recurrent or metastatic cervical cancer

Marketed by partners:
 Darzalex (IV) (daratumumab) / Darzalex Faspro (SC) (daratumumab and hyaluronidase-fihj) for the treatment of all stages of multiple myeloma as combination therapy or monotherapy, and for the treatment of newly diagnosed amyloid light-chain (AL) amyloidosis (Janssen)
 Rybrevant (amivantamab-vmjw) for the treatment of non-small-cell lung cancer (EGFR exon 20 insertion mutations) (Janssen)
 Tecvayli (teclistamab) for the treatment of relapsed/refractory MM (Janssen)
 Kesimpta (ofatumumab) for the treatment of relapsing remitting multiple sclerosis (Novartis)
 Tepezza (teprotumumab-trbw) for the treatment of thyroid eye disease (Horizon)

Furthermore both Genmab and its partners have a whole range of antibody programs, building on Genmab technologies, in clinical and pre-clinical development in both cancer and autoimmune diseases.Genmab have several late stage clinical programs for tisotumab vedotin (cervical cancer, ovarian cancer and solid tumors) and epcoritamab (diffuse large B-cell lymphoma and B-cell non-Hodgkin lymphoma).The partners have, among others, clinical programs for daratumumab (non-MM blood cancers), amivantamab (gastric cancer and esophageal cancer), Mim8 (Factor VIII mimetic bi-specific antibody) (Haemophilia A), inclacumab (VOC in Sickle cell disease) and teprotumumab (diffuse cutaneous systemic sclerosis).

Technology
Genmab's technology is licensed from Medarex to create fully human high affinity antibodies using transgenic mice. These antibodies are less likely to elicit an allergic reaction and other side effects compared with other types of man-made antibodies containing other animal proteins because the IgG antibodies produced have human proteins.  This technology is called the HuMab-Mouse technology. One benefit of using this type of technology is that there is no need for humanization or complicated genetic engineering to make this antibody fit for humans which cuts down on expenses and time spent developing it.  It can be generated within months and can be selected to bind to specific antigens such as tumor cells and other infectious agents.

Genmab also has developed its own technology called UniBody, which is used to make smaller antibodies in contrast to the traditional full sized monoclonal antibody. Its smaller size allows for better distribution over larger target areas like tumors. The UniBody can only bind to one site and doesn’t elicit a harmful immune response by binding to two sites and over-activating cell growth. It does not kill target cells but rather silences or inhibits them.  Thus it can be used to treat certain cancers, inflammations, allergies and asthmas, where killing the cell isn’t the objective.

The technology modifies the human IgG4 antibody.  Normally the IgG4 is considered inert and doesn’t elicit an immune response. However, they are also unstable and fall apart easily, which makes them unsuitable for therapeutic use. Genmab changes the shape of the IgG4 antibody by eliminating the hinge, the part of the antibody that creates the “Y” shape. This halves the antibody, creating a smaller version now known as their UniBody. This smaller version can only bind to one site and does not stimulate cancer cells to grow.

History 

Genmab was founded as a European spin-off of American Biotech company Medarex in February 1999.  Danish investment firm BankInvest, under Florian Schönharting, provided the seed investment for the company to start up in Copenhagen.  Like Medarex, Genmab began work producing monoclonal antibodies for life-threatening or debilitating diseases.  Rising quickly in the Biotech world, Genmab attracted many investors, especially venture capital firms.  The company went public in October 2000, earning DKK 1.56 billion, and had a second public offering in January 2006, yielding DKK 800 million.

The company's initial R&D location was a nine-story building in Utrecht Science Park, in the Netherlands; this was replaced with an "R&D Center" also in Utrecht, in June 2018.  By mid-2019, this new facility was at capacity, and plans were set afoot to build an adjacent, connected facility.

By 2001, Medarex and Genmab had come back together in a drug development partnership, which highlighted the manufacturing deficit and clinical development expertise of Genmab relative to Medarex.

In 2005, the Biotechnology Industry Organization (BIO) and the Long Island Life Sciences Initiative honored Genmab with a James D. Watson Helix Award.

2008 saw the company purchasing a 22,000-litre, 36-acre antibody manufacturing plant in Brooklyn Park, Minnesota from PDL BioPharma, with plans to retain all 170 employees thereat.  However, the company ran into financial trouble originating from several quarters, and a decision to sell the facility was reached in late 2009, after Genmab had started producing development scale batches from the facility.  In 2008, the world was experiencing a financial crisis as a whole, and GlaxoSmithKline decided to exit oncology, which impacted co-development of ofatumumab, an oncology-directed product.  In tandem with the sale of the plant, the company reorganized and planned to dismiss about 300 employees.  Selling the facility, though, proved very difficult, due in large part to the global financial crisis; by 2012, Genmab had decided to simply write-off the entire facility from the company's balance sheets.  A sale of the facility to Baxter came in February 2013.

Following the failed strategy of in-housing manufacturing, Genmab chose to thereafter completely outsource both manufacturing and the conduct of clinical trials.

The Company's first product, Arzerra (ofatumumab) reached the US market in 2009 for refractory chronic lymphocytic leukemia.

Executive history 
Lisa N. Drakeman, Ph.D. had been a vice president at Medarex and wife of Donald Drakeman, Medarex's CEO and President at the time.  Drakeman was one of Genmab's co-founders and was appointed chief executive officer (CEO) of the company upon incorporation in 1999, also joining the board of directors.  , Drakeman remained in the CEO role, but by 2010 she had announced her retirement.

In 2010, Jan Van de Winkel, a co-founder of the firm, was appointed as President and CEO of Genmab. Van de Winkel is a scientist, having produced more than 300 publications during his career.

Partnerships 
Amgen: In May 1999, Genmab entered a sub-license agreement with Amgen where it would gain rights to the IL15 antibodies.  In October 2001, this was replaced by a direct license agreement where Amgen retained exclusive commercialization options for the products through phase II.  Amgen has also expanded its agreement to a new antibody program targeting additional disease targets. Amgen has discontinued development of the IL15 antibody, AMG 714, in psoriasis and rheumatoid arthritis based on disappointing results from recent clinical studies. Amgen is exploring options to maximize the value of this asset, but as this time, no further internal development of a lead indication is planned.

GlaxoSmithKline: In December 2006, Genmab entered a deal with GlaxoSmithKline to co-develop and commercialize ofatumumab, a drug that could be used for treatment in CD20 positive B-cell chronic lymphocytic leukemia, follicular non-Hodgkin’s lymphoma, rheumatoid arthritis and other indications.  The agreement gave Genmab a license fee of DKK 582 million and GSK bought 4,471,202 shares of Genmab for DKK 2,033 million.  The potential value of this agreement could be DKK 12.0 billion if all milestones are reached and commercial success is reached in the fields of cancer, autoimmune, and inflammatory disease.  The intention of GlaxoSmithKline to exit oncology, disagreement around milestones reached, and financial difficulties of Genmab, led to re-negotiation of the partnership in mid-2010, resulting in an immediate  payment by GlaxoSmithKline and future financial and licensing concessions on the part of Genmab.

In addition, Genmab has collaborations with Roche (RG1507, a monoclonal antibody directed against IGF-1R, collaboration was terminated in 2009), Lundbeck and Seattle Genetics.

Products and pipeline 
Status, as of 22 February 2023

Genmab's Proprietary Products

Approved Medicines

Pipeline, Including Further Development for Approved Medicines

Programs Incorporating Genmab’s Innovation and Technology

Approved Medicines

Pipeline, Including Further Development for Approved Medicines, ≥Phase 2 Development

References 

Companies listed on Nasdaq Copenhagen
Pharmaceutical companies of Denmark
Biotechnology companies of Denmark
Life science companies based in Copenhagen
Pharmaceutical companies established in 1999
Biotechnology companies established in 1999
Danish companies established in 1999
Danish brands
Dual-listed companies
Companies based in Copenhagen Municipality